Tuguro-Chumikansky District is an administrative and municipal district (raion), one of the seventeen in Khabarovsk Krai, Russia. It is located in the center of the krai. Its administrative center is the rural locality (a selo) of Chumikan. Population:  The population of Chumikan accounts for 47.0% of the district's total population.

Geography
The district is located in the basin of the Uda and Tugur rivers. In the northeast it has a stretch of coastline of the Sea of Okhotsk indented by numerous bays. The district includes the Shantar Islands. The relief is dominated by the mountains of the Pribrezhny Range and the Taikan Range, among others. Bokon is the largest freshwater lake in the district.

Demographics
Ethnic composition (2010):
 Evenks – 49.5%
 Russians – 40.7%
 Evens – 4.1%
 Yakuts – 2.1%
 Ukrainians – 1.7%
 Others – 1.9%

References

Notes

Sources

Districts of Khabarovsk Krai